The 1872 Cup – also known as the 1872 Challenge Cup – is a men's rugby union tournament contested every year between the two Scottish professional clubs, Glasgow Warriors and Edinburgh Rugby.

Glasgow Warriors and Edinburgh Rugby use selected United Rugby Championship league matches against one another to decide the Cup winners. The highest aggregate score in the home and away ties decides the 1872 Champions.

Not only is the Glasgow – Edinburgh fixture the oldest inter-district rugby match in the world, but the derby is classed as one of the biggest in world rugby. Former Edinburgh coach, the South African Alan Solomons states: "These games are massive. For me, this is one of the big derbies of world rugby."

Not all Glasgow Warriors versus Edinburgh Rugby fixtures are deemed 1872 Cup matches. Should the sides play more matches against one another in a season than the nominated 1872 Cup matches, these other derby matches have no bearing on the 1872 Cup. For example, the Pro14 match of 28 August 2020 in the 2019-20 season between the clubs was the pair's fourth fixture together that season. The 1872 Cup was already decided in the derby fixture the week before, and the 28 August 2020 match was a normal Pro14 league match. Similarly the Glasgow Warriors versus Edinburgh Rugby fixture of 15 May 2021 was a normal Pro14 Rainbow Cup match, the 1872 Cup for that season decided in the Rainbow Cup match in the previous week.

History

The 1872 Cup marks the history of the world's oldest representative match. On 23 November 1872 a Glasgow District side met an Edinburgh District side at Burnbank Park, the home ground of 1st Lanarkshire Rifle Volunteers RFC and at the time also leased for use by Glasgow Academicals. Rugby Union was 20 a side in those days. Edinburgh won the first match. However, there was no cup to be won – and no cup was won until 1995.

District sides

Scotland was to have 4 District Sides: North and Midlands; South; Glasgow District and Edinburgh District. These sides would regularly play each other and a Scottish Inter-District Championship was introduced in 1953. A Scottish Exiles side was also introduced in the later McEwans District Championship.

Professionalism and the Inter-City Cup

The 4 District Sides North and Midlands, South, Glasgow and Edinburgh were to become Caledonia Reds, Border Reivers, Glasgow Warriors and Edinburgh Rugby with professionalism. These teams challenged in the Inter-District Championship for European qualification to the Heineken Cup. A Cup was offered by the Sponsors, the estate agents Slater, Hogg and Howison in 1995. In 1997–98 the competition received a new sponsor: Inter-City Trains – and the Cup became known as the Inter-City Cup.

When Caledonia Reds and Border Reivers were merged into the Glasgow and Edinburgh sides, Glasgow and Edinburgh played one-off matches for the Inter-City Cup from 1998 to 2002. The Cup became the Virgin Trains Cup with sponsorship in 2001–02 with the Welsh-Scottish League matches between the pair being used to determine the winner.

When the Border Reivers were revived in 2002 the Inter-City Cup was forgotten about and it sat in the old Glasgow & District Rugby Union office in Somerset Place, Glasgow for a few years. Unfortunately the Reivers folded again in 2007.

1872 Cup begins

The Cup was revived and rebranded by Glasgow Warriors and Edinburgh Rugby as the 1872 Cup in season 2007–08. 1872 thus marking the date of the oldest derby match in rugby union history between the original Glasgow and Edinburgh amateur district sides on which the professional clubs were founded.

Format of the Challenge Cup

From 2006 to 2017 the two league encounters of the Celtic League or the Pro12  were used to decide the winner of the 1872 Challenge Cup. Usually, these fixtures were scheduled as double-headers; home/away to rival one week and away/home to rival the next. These double-headers were often  scheduled around the weekends of Christmas and New Year.

The 2016–17 season's 1872 Cup matches did not follow the double header format.

From 2017 to 2021 the format of the 1872 Cup was deemed a best-of-three format using Pro14 or Pro14 Rainbow Cup matches.

In 2021, with the advent of the United Rugby Championship, Glasgow Warriors and Edinburgh Rugby reverted back to the traditional two league fixtures for the 1872 Cup.

The aggregate score of Glasgow Warriors and Edinburgh Rugby in the fixtures is taken into account in deciding the winner.

Where the aggregate score is tied the holder retains the trophy.

Sponsorship

The cup was originally sponsored by Greaves Sports. Crabbie's have been announced as the sponsor of the 2016–17 season's 1872 Cup.

List of results

Two-match format (2007–08 to 2016–17)

When the first Glasgow - Edinburgh derbies were played in 1872 onwards, these were twice a season fixtures (for the first 4 seasons). It was decided that a 2 match format would then decide the 1872 Cup.

Three-match format (2017–18 to 2020–21)

With the introduction of the South African teams, the Cheetahs and the Southern Kings, and the new league format named the Pro14; Glasgow and Edinburgh were designated to different conferences, resulting in one meeting during the season. As well as this, two additional derby matches were scheduled by the league, resulting in a three-game format for the Cup. The winner of the Cup will be the team that wins most matches, with the previous format of aggregate scores now being the first tie-break criteria. In a coronavirus pandemic affected 2020-21 season, neither the Cheetahs and the Southern Kings entered the Pro14 that season, the Kings having the misfortune to disband. However the Pro14 organised an additional tournament, the Rainbow Cup, which ensured Glasgow and Edinburgh had 3 1872 Cup fixtures in that season.

Two-match format (2021–22 onwards)

The introduction of 4 more South African teams, the Bulls, Lions, Sharks and Stormers, and the new league format now renamed the United Rugby Championship; Glasgow and Edinburgh were designated the same conference, resulting in the traditional 2 league meetings during the season.

Notes

See also

Glasgow District - for results of Glasgow - Edinburgh matches from 1872 to 1953; the 'Inter-City'
Edinburgh District - for results of Glasgow - Edinburgh matches from 1872 to 1953; the 'Inter-City'
Scottish Inter-District Championship - for results of Glasgow - Edinburgh matches from 1953 to 2003 in that championship.
Welsh-Scottish League - for results of Glasgow - Edinburgh matches from 1999 to 2002 in that championship.
Pro12 - for results of Glasgow - Edinburgh matches. See especially 2001 to 2007 in that championship; before the 1872 Cup began.
Pro14 - for results of Glasgow - Edinburgh matches from season 2017–18.
 - for a detailed season by season guide of Glasgow Warriors. This also includes 'friendly matches' between Glasgow - Edinburgh. For instance: 1999–2000 Glasgow Warriors season details 5 Glasgow - Edinburgh matches over the course of the season.
 - for a detailed season by season guide of Edinburgh Rugby.

Other celtic derbies

Judgement Day - Welsh derbies

References

External links
Scottish Rugby on 1872 Cup 
1872 - A rugby rivalry (video)

 
United Rugby Championship
Glasgow Warriors
Edinburgh Rugby
2007 establishments in Scotland
Rugby union trophies and awards